The Airship, or 100 Years Hence is an American adventure comedy-drama silent short film written, produced and directed by J. Stuart Blackton. The film stars Blackton and Florence Lawrence. It was released on April 25, 1908 by The American Vitagraph Company; a partial print of The Airship, or 100 Years Hence is preserved in the Paper Print Collection (Library of Congress). The Airship, or 100 Years Hence advertised that it would be "a forecast of a probable means of air navigation in the coming century."

Plot
A young lady and a friend are observed entering an airship, which is loaded with ballast, sand bags, vegetables, and more. They laugh heartily, shake hands and are off. Another individual equipped with wings, in the clouds. Below, a Jewish man walking down the street, has  some sawdust fall on him, then some vegetables. All the items are falling from the airship.

Other pedestrians including a policeman, stop and look upward, and are showered with vegetables. An air-cycle cop is summoned, who mounts his machine and flies upward.

The Jewish man reaches his pawn shop where a man comes in to pawn a pair of wings. The broker gives the loan, tries on his strange equipment, and soars up into the sky. In a collision, the air-cycle cop causing the broker to fall through space, lighting on the moon for a moment, then into the ocean. At the sea bottom, the broker flirts with mermaids, but a whale suddenly swallows him up.

On a passing ship, sailors are fishing and catch the whale, cutting it open to find the hapless broker.

Cast
 Florence Lawrence as Airship passenger
 J. Stuart Blackton

Production
Blackton was one of the first filmmakers to use the techniques of stop-motion and drawn animation, and is considered a father of American animation. The Airship, or 100 Years Hence was produced by the Vitagraph Company of America.

Reception
In projections, The Airship, or 100 Years Hence was programmed with the split reel system, merged into a single reel with another short film produced by Vitagraph, True Hearts Are More Than Coronets.Phil Hardy in The Encyclopedia of Science Fiction Movies (1984) noted that "the film was never intended to be taken seriously."

Aviation historian Michael Paris wrote, The Airship, or 100 Years Hence "... combined novelty and comedy."

References

Notes

Citations

Bibliography

 Hardy, Phil. The Encyclopedia of Science Fiction Movies. Woodbury, Tennessee: Woodbury Press, 1984. .
 Menville, Douglas, R. Reginald with Mary A. Burgess. Futurevisions: The New Golden Age of the Science Fiction Film. San Bernardino, California: Borgo Press, 1985. .
 Paris, Michael. From the Wright Brothers to Top Gun: Aviation, Nationalism, and Popular Cinema. Manchester, UK: Manchester University Press, 1995. .

External links

1908 films
1908 animated films
American animated comedy films
1900s animated short films
American black-and-white films
American aviation films
American silent short films
Films directed by J. Stuart Blackton
1900s comedy-drama films
Vitagraph Studios short films
1908 short films
1900s American animated films
American adventure comedy-drama films
1900s adventure comedy films
Silent adventure comedy-drama films
Silent American comedy-drama films